Khela Hobe is a 2023 Indian Hindi-language film  starring Late Om Puri and Mugdha Godse. The film gathered the headlines due to its title as it is one of the famous slogan of the West Bengal Chief Minister Mamta Banerjee. The censor board had chopped few dialogues as it was objectionable.

Plot
This story revolves around a woman who decides to contest election to take revenge against the oppression faced by her and her family, She fights election with a new agenda, other contender's fight election on the basis of secularism and progress in town, whether the major contenders using the ancient agenda of secularism or progress would win, or there will be some surprise in the result.

Cast
 Late Om Puri as Fareek Bhai
 Mugdha Godse as Shabbo
 Manoj Joshi as   Bachchu Lal
 Rushad Rana as Thakur Virendra Pratap
 Rati Agnihotri as Om Puri wife Ruksana
 Sanjay Batra as  Girish Gupta
 Sanjay Sonu as Israr bhai
 Ratan Mayal as Doctor
 Shefali as a badminton player (young)
 Aaryan A as boyfriend of Shefali

Production
Khela Hobe is produced under the banner of Theme Arts International and Sunil C Sinha Production and presented by UMW media. The film is produced by Kumari Manju and directed by Sunil C Sinha. The story and dialogue by Ravi Kumar and music and lyrics by Sanjiv Chaturvedi and Rajesh Trivedi. Ajay Keshwani and Harsh Raj Harsh have also given the music.The film has been shot in Mumbai and Varanasi.It will release in the theatre on 24th Feb,2023.

References

External links
 https://www.bollywoodhungama.com/movie/khela-hobe/
 
 https://www.filmibeat.com/bollywood/movies/khela-hobe.html
 https://www.cinestaan.com/movies/khela-hobe-50917/cast-crew

2023 films
Hindi-language drama films
Indian drama films
2020s Hindi-language films